National Route 342 is a national highway of Japan connecting Yokote, Akita and Tome, Miyagi in Japan, with a total length of .

See also

References

National highways in Japan
Roads in Akita Prefecture
Roads in Iwate Prefecture
Roads in Miyagi Prefecture